The World Jigsaw Puzzle Championship, is an annual event organized by the World Jigsaw Puzzle Federation (WJPF). The World Championship was started in 2019 and the first city to hold it was Valladolid, Spain. The Championship include three events: Team, pairs and individual.  It is the first time a world ranking is available for jigsaw puzzle competitors.

History
In 2019 the World Jigsaw Federation, WJPF, was founded and in the same year, the first World Jigsaw Championship was held in Valladolid, Spain.
The tournament was scheduled for 2020, but due the global COVID-19 pandemic it had to be canceled that year and was also canceled again in 2021. The World Championship was held again in 2022.

Events
Three events were contested as part of the Championships:

 Team event: Teams of 4 members do the number of puzzles agreed by the organization and the fastest to complete them within the established time is the winning team.
 Pairs event: Two people make the puzzle agreed by the organization (500 or 1000 pieces) and the fastest couple to complete it within the established time is the winner.
 Individual event: Each individual participant make a jigsaw puzzle of 500 pieces in the period accorded, and the fastest to finish it is the champion.

Championships

All-time medal table
Updated after 2022 World Jigsaw Puzzle Championship

References

External links
 
 
 

Jigsaw puzzles
Board games competitions